The primacy of Peter, also known as Petrine primacy (from the , "Peter"), is the position of preeminence that is attributed to Peter among the Twelve Apostles.

Primacy of Peter among the Apostles 

The Evangelical Dictionary of Theology illustrates the leading role that Peter played among the Apostles, speaking up on matters that concern them all, being called by Jesus by a name linking him with the rock on which Jesus would build his church, being charged with pastoring the flock of Christ, and taking the leading role in the initial church as described in the Acts of the Apostles.

There is general agreement among scholars on the preeminence that the historical Peter held among the disciples of Jesus, making him "the most prominent and influential member of the Twelve during Jesus' ministry and in the early Church".

In one interpretation, the prominence that the New Testament and other early Christian writings attribute to Peter is due to their seeing him as a unifying factor in contrast to other figures identified with disputed interpretations of Christianity.

Catholic view

In Catholicism, it is held that the primacy of Peter is a basis for the primacy of the bishop of Rome over other bishops throughout the Catholic Church. This extension of Petrine primacy to popes is known as the primacy of the Bishop of Rome. This Catholic Church doctrine holds that the pope as Bishop of Rome has authority delegated from Jesus to rule over the entire Church. There are various views on the nature of the primacy and how it has been exercised and passed on. This belief makes a distinction between the personal prestige of Peter and the supremacy of the office of pope which Catholics believe Jesus instituted in the person of Peter.

In the New Testament, which some call the New Law or "New Greek Testament", Matthew 16:16–18 reports that Jesus changed Simon's name to Peter. Elsewhere in Scripture such a name change always denotes some change in status (e.g., Abram to Abraham, Jacob to Israel, and Saul to Paul). In the gospels, Peter is shown as a close associate of Jesus. His home at Capernaum was at Jesus' disposal, as was his fishing boat, when needed. Jesus cured Peter's mother-in-law, and Peter was among those who attended the wedding at Cana. He plays a prominent part in the account of the miraculous catch of fish, and the walking on the water. In John 20, when Peter and the other disciple run to the empty tomb, the other disciple arrives first, but it is Peter who enters the tomb.

Though among the twelve disciples, Peter is predominant in the first chapters of Acts of the Apostles, James the Just is shown to be a leader in his own right in later chapters. Indeed, he is commonly considered the first Bishop of Jerusalem. However, Catholics believe the bishop of Jerusalem was not by that fact the head of the Catholic church, since the leadership rested in Peter as the "Rock" and "Chief Shepherd". It is believed Peter entrusted the Jerusalem community to James when he was forced to leave Jerusalem due to Herod Agrippa's persecution. Furthermore, at the Council of Jerusalem in Acts 15, James uses the Greek  to refer to Peter's statements, which refers to literally "declaring" or "issuing a ruling." However, James uses the Greek word  in relation to his statements, which refers to literally "giving one's opinion," and does not denote authority. Catholic scholar Michael M. Winter puts it in his Saint Peter and the Popes in the following terms: "The speech of St. James is of a different character [from that of St. Peter]. He acquiesces to what St. Peter had said, although it seems to have been against his personal inclinations, and then puts forward a practical suggestion for the sake of harmony."

The 4th century Latin Father Jerome, in his epistle to Augustine of Hippo, wrote that "nay more, that Peter was the prime mover in issuing the decree by which this was affirmed," in relation to the Council of Jerusalem, and again, "and to his opinion the Apostle James, and all the elders together, gave consent."

Jesus said to Peter in verse 19, "I will give to thee the keys of the kingdom of heaven." Especially for the Hebrew people, keys were a symbol of authority; keys are also used to symbolise power over death in Revelation 1:18. Cardinal Gibbons, in his book The Faith of Our Fathers, points out that keys are still a symbol of authority in today's culture; he uses the example of someone giving the keys of his house to another person, and that the latter represented the owner of the house in his absence. In receiving the keys, Peter takes on the office of prime minister, which was well-known to ancient and contemporary Hebrews, and depicted in the Old Testament, as the one who had authority from God to bind and loose.

The Dogmatic Constitution, Pastor aeternus, issued by the First Vatican Council, defined the primacy of the bishop of Rome over the whole Catholic Church as an essential institution of the church that can never be relinquished. This is based on the statement in Matthew 16:18 "And so I say to you, you are Peter, and upon this rock I will build my church,* and the gates of the netherworld shall not prevail against it", and John 21:17 "He said to him the third time, “Simon, son of John, do you love me?” Peter was distressed that he had said to him a third time, “Do you love me?” and he said to him, “Lord, you know everything; you know that I love you.” [Jesus] said to him, “Feed my sheep." This conversation with Peter established Peter as the leader of the disciples in Jesus’ absence. 
[I]t has been ever understood by the Catholic Church ...that Peter in his single person, preferably to all the other Apostles, whether taken separately or together, was endowed by Christ with a true and proper primacy of jurisdiction; ...bestowed immediately and directly upon blessed Peter himself, ... 

In December 1996, the Congregation for the Doctrine of the Faith held a doctrinal symposium on "The Primacy of the Successor of Peter". One of the "Reflections" on the essential points of Catholic doctrine on the primacy is that it is a necessary service to unity. A listing of some of the essential points of the doctrine was issued by the prefect of the CDF, Joseph Cardinal Ratzinger. Noting that in the list of the Twelve Apostles in the Synoptics and Acts, Simon/Peter appears first. "From the beginning and with increasing clarity, the Church has understood that, just as there is a succession of the Apostles in the ministry of Bishops, so too the ministry of unity entrusted to Peter belongs to the permanent structure of Christ's Church and that this succession is established in the see of his martyrdom.

The Catechism of the Catholic Church states:

Individuals supporting Roman primacy
Both Latin and Greek writers in the early church referred to "rock" as applying to both Peter personally and his faith symbolically, as well as seeing Christ's promise to apply more generally to his twelve apostles and the Catholic Church at large.

Irenaeus
Irenaeus has been called the most important witness of Christianity in the 2nd century. Taught by Polycarp, who had been instructed by John the apostle, Irenaeus became Bishop of Lyon in 178. In his Against the Heresies, Irenaeus wrote, "Although there are many dialects in the world, the force of the tradition is one and the same. For the same faith is held and handed down by the churches established in the German states, the Spains, among the Celtic tribes, in the East, in Libya, and in the central portions of the world." In Book 3, Irenaeus continues his defense of the unity of the church around the bishop, writing, "By pointing out the apostolic tradition and faith announced to mankind, which has been brought down to our time by successions of bishops, in the greatest, most ancient, and well known church, founded and established by the two most glorious apostles, Peter and Paul, at Rome, we can confound all who in any other way … gather more than they ought."

Irenaeus asserted the Doctrine of Apostolic Succession to counter the claims of heretics, especially the Gnostics who were attacking the theology and authority of the mainstream church. He stated that one could find true teaching in several leading episcopal sees, not just at Rome. The doctrine he asserted, therefore, has two parts: lineage from the Apostles and right teaching.

Ignatius of Antioch
Ignatius, bishop of Antioch, was well known for his insistence on the authority of the bishop. In his writings to the church at Smyrna in 115 AD, he encouraged the Smyrnaeans to "Avoid divisions, as the beginning of evil. Follow, all of you, the bishop, as Jesus Christ followed the father; and follow the presbytery as the apostles. Let no man do aught pertaining to the Church apart from the bishop. Wheresoever the bishop appears, there let the people be, even as wheresoever Christ Jesus is, there is the Catholic Church."

Tertullian
Born in Carthage around 155 AD, Tertullian became a priest around the age of forty and worked tirelessly to defend the faith. In his Scorpiace of 208 AD, Tertullian wrote, "No delay or inquest will meet Christians on the threshold. …For though you think that heaven is still shut up, remember that the Lord left the keys of it to Peter here, and through him to the Church, which keys everyone will carry with him, if he has been questioned and made confession [of faith]." Scorpiace is the first known historical reference to the keys pertaining to anyone other than Peter. In it, he saw the keys as pertaining to "everyone" if they "made confession", rather than according to the modern interpretation concerning the bishops of Rome alone. Tertullian later retracted even this association in De Pudecitia, listing various reasons why the Keys of Peter pertained to Peter alone. The churches later declared him an apostate along with the followers of Montanus for insisting that authority must be associated with demonstrable power.

Cyprian
Thascius Caecilius Cyprianus was made bishop of Carthage in 248 AD. but died only ten years later. Throughout his writings, Cyprian asserts that the Rock is Peter, and the church rests upon him. He also claims that as the church is settled upon the bishops, they too have authority. He writes, "They, who have departed from the Church, do not allow the Church to recall and bring back the lapsed. There is one God, and one Christ, and one Church, and one chair founded by the voice of the Lord on the rock. Another altar cannot be set up, nor a new priesthood made, besides the one altar and the one priesthood. Whoever gathers elsewhere scatters." In his 251 AD De Catholicae Ecclesiae Unitate, Cyprian asks, "He who deserts the chair of Peter, upon whom the Church was founded, does he trust himself to be in the Church?"

Regarding the interpretation of Matthew 16:18-19, Jaroslav Pelikan writes: "[T]he ancient Christian father Cyprian used it to prove the authority of the bishop—not merely of the Roman bishop, but of every bishop," referring to Maurice Bevenot's work on St. Cyprian. Eastern Catholics agree with the above, and hold the same essential doctrines as all other Catholics, but also as a theological reflection usually consider Peter in some way to exemplify the other bishops as well.

John Chrysostom
John Chrysostom was born at Antioch around 347 and would fight for the reform of the church until his exile in 404. His homilies emphasize his belief in the primacy. He called Peter "the leader of the choir, the mouth of all the apostles, the head of that tribe, the ruler of the whole world, the foundation of the Church, the ardent lover of Christ." His writings also emphasize the mortality of Peter, linking him more closely to the people of the church.

Augustine of Hippo
Augustine of Hippo was born in Numidia in 354 AD and was baptized in Milan in 387 AD. He was also bishop of Hippo from 397 AD until his death in 430 AD. Augustine taught that Peter was first amongst the apostles, and thus represents the church. His Sermo states, "Peter in many places in the Scriptures appears to represent the Church, especially in that place where it was said 'I give to thee the keys … shall be loosed in heaven'. What! did Peter receive these keys, and Paul not receive? Did Peter receive and John and James not receive, and the rest of the apostles? But since in a figure Peter represented the Church, what was given to him singly was given to the Church." His 395 AD Contra Epistolam Manichaei states, "There are many other things which rightly keep me in the bosom of the Catholic Church. …The succession of the priests keeps me, from the very seat of the apostle Peter (to whom the Lord after his resurrection gave charge to feed his sheep) down to the present episcopate."

Pope Innocent I
Innocent I held the papal office from 402 to 417. Modern theories of papal primacy developed around Innocent and his writings. In a 416 AD letter to Decentius, bishop of Eugubium, Innocent writes, "Who does not know or observe that it [the church order] was delivered by Peter the chief of the apostles to the Roman church, and is kept until now, and ought to be retained by all, and that nothing ought to be imposed or introduced which has no authority, or seems to derive its precedents elsewhere?" It is also during this time that bishops began to recognize Innocent's primacy as Pope over other bishops in the West. This is made evident, among others, in a letter from the Council at Mileve to Innocent in 416 AD, which alludes to the authority of "his holiness" drawn from the authority of Scripture. The doctrine of primacy was beginning to take shape with Innocent's papacy.

Pope Leo I
Based on his knowledge of the Petrine texts of the Gospel, and his writings which expound upon it, it is easy to see that Leo I identified with the authority bestowed on Peter as bishop of Rome. Leo himself was consecrated bishop of Rome in 440 AD. He writes that "The right of this power did indeed pass on to other apostles, and the order of this decree passed on to all the chiefs of the Church; but not in vain was that which was imparted to all entrusted to but one. Therefore this is commended to Peter separately, because all the rulers of the Church are invested with the figure of Peter. …So then in Peter the strength of all is fortified, and the help of divine grace is so ordered that the stability which through Christ is given to Peter, through Peter is conveyed to the apostles." The Council of Chalcedon would later refer to Leo as "him who had been charged with the custody of the vine by the savior."

Pope Gregory VII
The Gregorian Reform movement was rather a series of movements many of which involved the reform of the Catholic Church, headed by Gregory VII, formerly the Archdeacon Hildebrand. Gregory became Pope in 1073 with the objective of reforming not the body of the church, but a purification of the clergy in general. Gregory is perhaps most recognized with the quarrel between himself and King Henry IV of Germany, known as the "Investiture Contest". Gregory's Dictus Pape outlines his policies and ideals, as well as those of the Catholic Church. In this work, Gregory claims that the pope has power to depose and restore bishops, and also effectively reduces the authority of other bishops. This doctrine supported the idea that Rome and the church here also afforded primacy over all other churches. Gregory's papacy also bolstered the power of the church over that of the State. The Gregorians defended the ideal of a separation of powers, claiming "Let kings have what belongs to kings, and priests have what belongs to priests." The Petrine primacy was now more affirmed than ever.

Challenges

Councils
Many challenges faced the popes claiming primacy throughout the history of Catholicism. The Edict of Milan, the Council of Nicea, and the First Council of Constantinople all dealt with the issue of primacy in that they amended the power of the popes over the other bishops. The third canon of the First Council of Constantinople of 381 AD declares Constantinople the new Rome, gives the Bishop of Rome the seat of honor and gives the Bishop of Constantinople second place in honor. The Council of Ephesus in 431 AD offers debate as to whether the results determine that the pope is at the head of the church, or rather that it is under the authority of a council of bishops. Although the highlight of the Council of Chalcedon in 451 AD was the confession of the Person of Christ, the Council also resulted in limitations to the powers of the bishops. Many letters of the Council identify its position as in agreement with papal primacy. Those present employ titles such as "the most holy and beloved of God" and "ecumenical archbishop and patriarch of great Rome" to address Pope Leo. Thus, as not all can be satisfied with the results, the Council of Chalcedon resulted in a schism with the Oriental Orthodox Church.

Schism
The papacy's most widely known crisis, as well as its largest challenge to authority, came with the "Western Schism" in the late Middle Ages, dating from 1378–1417. Seven popes ruled from Avignon in France in the early 14th century, until Gregory XI risked returning to turbulent Italy and the Roman seat. Following the close of the Avignon papacy in 1377, Urban VI, an Italian, took the reins over a predominantly French college of Cardinals. The Cardinals called the election into question and elected Clement VII as Pope. Germany, Italy, England, and the rest of Northern and Eastern Europe remained loyal to Urban, while France, Spain, Scotland, and Rome followed Clement VII (1378–1394) and his successor, Benedict XIII (1394–1417) who would reside in Avignon.

Matthew 16:18 

Controversy has surrounded one particular text that is linked with the Aramaic nickname , meaning "rock," that Jesus gave the man previously known as Simon.

While the reasons for disagreement on the nature of the primacy are complex, hinging on matters of doctrine, history and politics, the debate is often reduced to a discussion of the meaning and translation of Matthew 16:18: "And I say to thee: That thou art Peter; and upon this rock I will build my church, and the gates of hell shall not prevail against it."

A literal translation, in the style of the King James Version, of the words presumably used by Jesus would be "Thou art Rock, and upon this rock will I build my church".

One common Protestant argument historically has been that the translation from the New Testament in Hebrew into Greek is tenuous at best as there is no real evidence or indication that the New Testament (in Greek) was ever translated from Hebrew or Aramaic texts; for that argument see Aramaic primacy. Since the Protestant Reformation, many non-Catholics have challenged the Catholic Church's position, questioning whether the feminine πέτρα refers to Peter, and claiming it may instead refer to either Peter's confession of faith or to Jesus himself.

Eastern Orthodox view

Many hold the Primacy of Peter

The Eastern Orthodox Church regards the Apostle Peter, together with the Apostle Paul, as "preeminent apostles". Another title used for Peter is Coryphaeus, which could be translated as "Choir-director," or lead singer.

Orthodox scholars follow John Chrysostom and the Byzantine tradition in seeing Peter as the icon of the episcopate with his title of protos (first) implying a certain level of authority over the other apostles. In this traditional Orthodox and Patristic view, the church is the local Eucharistic assembly ("the diocese" in today's terminology) and the one who holds the "Chair of Peter" (Cyprian's expression) is the bishop. As a result, the primacy of Peter is relevant to the relationship between the bishop and the presbyters, not between the bishop of Rome and the other bishops who are all equally holding Peter's chair.

As John Meyendorff explained:

The notion that many Sees were 'of Peter' had also once been held in the West. Pope Gregory I states that:

 However, the Ecumenical Patriarch of Constantinople sends a delegation each year to Rome to participate in the celebration of the feast of Saints Peter and Paul.

The Orthodox also consider that Pope Linus, not Peter, was actually the first Bishop of Rome.

'Keys' and 'rock' not exclusive to Peter
Eastern Orthodox theologians agree that in Matthew 16:18, "rock" is a likely reference to Peter personally since the very name "Peter" means "rock". However, Matthew 18:18 implies that the other Apostles were given the same powers. Although the word keys is explicitly absent from this later verse a number of Church Fathers recognised that the meaning of keys is implicitly there, and that the rest of the church has the keys:

Moreover, Eastern Orthodox theologians follow such Church Fathers as John Chrysostom by clarifying that "rock" simultaneously refers to Peter (instrumentally) as well as Peter's confession of faith which is what has ultimate significance in establishing the church.

Some Orthodox scholars do not see Peter as being in any way above the other apostles, arguing that Peter did not have power and authority over them during Christ's public ministry. There were no positions of power between the twelve disciples, only "degrees of intimacy" or "degrees of honor." According to this view, Peter has a weak symbolic primacy or primacy of honor (in the sense of a purely honorary primacy). In the patristic era, this was actually the Western view held by St. Augustine. Others (see above), following the traditional Byzantine view of John Chrysostom see Peter as the icon of the bishop and therefore endowed with authority in the church (i.e. the diocese).

Examples from history
Orthodox historians also maintain that Rome's authority in the early Eastern Roman (or Byzantine) empire was recognized only partially because of Rome's Petrine character, and that this factor was not the decisive issue. Moreover, the Orthodox view is that Rome's privileges were not understood as an absolute power (i.e., the difference between primacy and supremacy). In the East, there were numerous "apostolic sees", Jerusalem being considered the "mother of all churches", and the bishop of Antioch could also claim the title of successor to Peter, being that Peter was the first bishop of Antioch. "Canon 28 of Chalcedon was for [the Byzantines] one of the essential texts for the organization of the Church: "'It is for right reasons that accorded privileges to old Rome, for this city was the seat of the Emperor and the Senate.' ...The reason why the Roman Church had been accorded an incontestable precedence over all other apostolic churches was that its Petrine and Pauline 'apostolicity' was in fact added to the city's position as the capital city, and only the conjunction of both of these elements gave the Bishop of Rome the right to occupy the place of a primate in the Christian world with the consensus of all the churches."

Protestant views

A major debate between Catholics and Protestants centers on Matthew 16:18 where Jesus tells Peter: "You are Peter, and on this rock I will build my Church." Catholics interpret the verse as saying that Jesus would build his church on Peter, the apostle: Jesus told Peter (Rock) that he would build his Church on this Rock (Peter), and that Peter was made the shepherd of the apostolic flock – hence their assertion of the Primacy of the Catholic Pontiff.

One Protestant view on the Matthew verse agrees with the Catholic view, with disagreements about primacy stemming from doctrinal sources, and disagreements such as those over the identification of Simon Peter with the Pope. Other Protestants assert the following, based specifically on the verse in Matthew:

Jesus gives Simon the new name . This scripture was written in Greek, not Aramaic; what Jesus might have said in Aramaic is conjecture. In Greek, there is a distinction between the two words,  being a "rock" but  being a "small stone" or "pebble". (James G. McCarthy translates the two as "mass of rock" and "boulder or detached stone", respectively.) Jesus is not referring to Peter when talking about "this rock", but is in fact referring to Peter's confession of faith in the preceding verses. Jesus thus does not declare the primacy of Peter, but rather declares that his church will be built upon the foundation of the revelation of and confession of faith of Jesus as the Christ.

Many Protestant scholars, however, reject this position, such as Craig L. Blomberg who states, "The expression 'this rock' almost certainly refers to Peter, following immediately after his name, just as the words following 'the Christ' in verse 16 applied to Jesus. The play on words in the Greek between Peter's name (Petros) and the word 'rock' (petra) makes sense only if Peter is the Rock and if Jesus is about to explain the significance of this identification."

Donald A. Carson III states:

An alternate Protestant argument is that when Jesus said "upon this rock" in the aforementioned Matthew verse, he referred to himself, in reference to Deuteronomy 32:3–4, which states that "God ... is the Rock, his work is perfect". This idea also appears in 1 Corinthians 10:4, which says "...that Rock is Christ." In Ephesians 2:20, Jesus is called "the chief cornerstone".

Meaning of "Rock"

Furthermore, since Jesus presumably spoke to Peter in their native Aramaic language, he would have used  in both instances. The Peshitta Text and the Old Syriac text use the word  for both "Peter" and "rock" in Matthew 16:18. John 1:42 says Jesus called Simon "Cephas", as does Paul in some letters. He was instructed by Christ to strengthen his brethren, i.e., the apostles. Peter also had a leadership role in the early Christian church at Jerusalem according to the Acts of the Apostles chapters 1–2, 10–11, and 15.

Early Catholic Latin and Greek writers (such as John Chrysostom) considered the "foundation rock" as applying to both Peter personally and his confession of faith (or the faith of his confession) symbolically, as well as seeing Christ's promise to apply more generally to his twelve apostles and the Christian Church at large. This "double meaning" interpretation is present in the current Catechism of the Catholic Church.

Protestant counter-claims to the Catholic interpretation are largely based on the difference between the Greek words translated "Rock" in the Matthean passage. In classical Attic Greek  generally meant "pebble," while  meant "boulder" or "cliff". Accordingly, taking Peter's name to mean "pebble", they argue that the "rock" in question cannot have been Peter, but something else, either Jesus himself, or the faith in Jesus that Peter had just professed.

However, even though the feminine noun  is translated as rock in the phrase "on this rock I will build my church," the word  is also used in 1 Corinthians 10:4 in describing Jesus, which reads: "They all ate the same spiritual food and drank the same spiritual drink; for they drank from the spiritual rock that accompanied them, and that rock was Christ."

Although Matthew 6 is used as a primary proof-text for the Catholic doctrine of Papal supremacy, Protestant scholars say that prior to the Reformation of the 16th century, Matthew 16 was very rarely used to support papal claims. Their position is that most of the early and medieval church interpreted the 'rock' as being a reference either to Christ or to Peter's faith, not Peter himself. They understand Jesus' remark to have been his affirmation of Peter's testimony that Jesus was the Son of God.

Another rebuttal of the Catholic position is that if Peter really means the Rock which makes him the chief of Apostles, it would contradict the Bible's teaching in Ephesians 2:20, which says that the church's foundation is the apostles and prophets, not Peter alone. They posit that the meaning of Matthew 16:18 is that Jesus uses a play on words with Peter's name to say that the confession he had just made is the rock on which the church is built.

The Lutheran theologians state that the dictionaries of Koine Greek, including the authoritative Bauer-Danker-Arndt-Gingrich Lexicon, indeed list both words and the passages that give different meanings for each. Conservative Lutheran apologists state:

Partial Protestant support

Partial support for the Catholic position comes from Oscar Cullmann. He disagrees with Luther and the Protestant reformers who held that by "rock" Christ did not mean Peter, but meant either himself or the faith of His followers. He believes the meaning of the original Aramaic is very clear: that  was the Aramaic word for "rock", and that it was also the name by which Christ called Peter.

Yet, Cullmann sharply rejects the Catholic claim that Peter began the papal succession. He writes: "In the life of Peter there is no starting point for a chain of succession to the leadership of the church at large." While he believes the Matthew text is entirely valid and is in no way spurious, he says it cannot be used as "warrant of the papal succession."

Cullmann concludes that while Peter was the original head of the apostles, Peter was not the founder of any visible church succession.

There are other Protestant scholars who also partially defend the historical Catholic position about the "Rock". In any case, a / distinction is irrelevant considering the Aramaic language in which the phrase might well have been spoken. Peter was also referred to as the first pope of the Catholic Church which was believed by the Romans in 69AD

However, still other Protestant scholars believe that Jesus in fact did mean to single out Peter as the very rock which he will build upon, but that the passage does nothing to indicate a continued succession of Peter's implied position. They assert that Matthew uses the demonstrative pronoun , which allegedly means "this very" or "this same", when he refers to the rock on which Jesus' church will be built. He also uses the Greek word for "and", . The second rock Jesus refers to must then be the same rock as the first one; and if Peter is the first rock he must also be the second.

The New Apostolic Church believes in the re-established Apostle ministry. It sees Peter as the first Chief Apostle in the Early Church.

Lutheran view
From the Book of Concord:

Unlike Oscar Cullmann, Confessional Lutherans and many other Protestant apologists agree that it is meaningless to elaborate the meaning of Rock by looking at the Aramaic language, as while it is true that Jews spoke mostly Aramaic at home, in public, they typically spoke in Greek. The few Aramaic words spoken by Jesus in public were unusual, and noted for this reason. Also contributing to the view held by many Lutherans that the interpretation of Rock through the Aramaic is pointless is the fact that the New Testament was written in Koine Greek, and not Aramaic.

Modern Lutheran historians even disclose that the Catholic Church did not, at least unanimously, regard Peter as the Rock until the 1870s:

Lutheran apologists criticize:

View of The Church of Jesus Christ of Latter-day Saints
The Church of Jesus Christ of Latter-day Saints (LDS Church) accepts the primacy of Peter, although it does not generally use the term. The LDS Church teaches that Peter was the chief apostle and head of the church after Christ's ascension. The LDS Church further teaches that all Melchizedek Priesthood authority in the church must come through a line of authority traceable directly from Christ through Peter. However, in contrast to other groups, they believe that the line of succession was at some point broken following the death of the apostles, necessitating a restoration of the priesthood authority. The LDS Church teaches that this restoration occurred with the appearance of the resurrected Peter, James, and John, who conferred the authority on Joseph Smith and Oliver Cowdery in 1829. All ordained members of the LDS Church can obtain a written line of authority tracing back to Christ through Peter.

Despite the acceptance of Peter's primacy, several leaders of the LDS Church have taught that the rock referred to by Jesus in Matthew 16:18 was neither Peter nor his confession, but the gift of revelation from the Holy Spirit which made Christ's divinity known to Peter. Apostle Howard W. Hunter taught:

Church founder Joseph Smith is quoted as having said:

Although these quotes may represent normative LDS belief, none of them are from canonized doctrinal sources. The LDS Church therefore has no official doctrinal interpretation of Matthew 16:18.

See also
 Apostolic Succession
 Early Christianity
 Historical episcopate
 Papal infallibility
 Papal supremacy

Notes

References

Further reading
 Addis, William E. & Thomas Arnold (rev. T.B. Scannell). Catholic Dictionary. (9th ed.) London: Virtue & Co., 1925. (Provides citations for the use of "πέτρος" to mean "rock" in classical works)

Chadwick, Henry. The Church in Ancient Society: From Galilee to Gregory the Great. Oxford: Oxford University Press, 2001.
Collins, Paul. Upon This Rock: The Popes and their Changing Roles. Melbourne: Melbourne University Press, 2000.

Evans, G.R. The Church in the Early Middle Ages. I.B. Tauris: New York, 2007.
Maxwell-Stuart, P.G. Chronicle of the Popes: the Reign-by-Reign Record of the Papacy from St. Peter to the Present. 2nd ed. London : Thames & Hudson, 2006.
 Meyendorff, John, ed. The Primacy of Peter: Essays in Ecclesiology and the Early Church.
Perkins, Pheme. Peter: Apostle for the Whole Church. Columbia: University of South Carolina Press, 1994.
Pham, John-Peter. Heirs of the Fisherman: Behind the Scenes of Papal Death and Succession. New York: Oxford University Press, 2004.
 Ray, Stephen K. Upon This Rock: St. Peter and the Primacy of Rome in Scripture and the Early Church.
Webster, William. "The Matthew 16 Controversy". Calvary Press, 1996.  
Winter, Michael M. Saint Peter and the Popes. Baltimore: Helicon Press, 1960.

Saint Peter
Bible-related controversies
1st-century Christianity
Gospel of Matthew
Papal primacy